Natale col Boss ("Christmas with the Boss") is a 2015 Italian criminal comedy film written and directed  by Volfango De Biasi. It grossed $8,528,805 at the Italian box office.

Plot 
In Naples, a mafia boss realizes that his cover is blown, and that the police know his face. So he calls Lillo & Greg surgeons to make change face and to look like Leonardo DiCaprio. But the two surgeons misunderstand, and turn him into Peppino Di Capri! Meanwhile, two bungling policemen are put on the boss' tracks, but the exchange with the real Peppino Di Capri, on tour in Naples for a concert!

Cast 
  
 Lillo as  Alex
 Greg as  Dino 
 Paolo Ruffini as Cosimo  
 Francesco Mandelli as Leo / Mamma Santissima
  Giulia Bevilacqua as  Sara
 Peppino di Capri as  Boss Salvatore Fontebasso aka Scavafosse / Himself
 Enrico Guarneri as  Police Commissioner Zaganetti
 Giovanni Esposito as  Mamma Santissima's Nephew
 Michela Andreozzi as  Azzurra
 Francesco Di Leva as  Fefè
 Francesco Pennasilico as  Mario
Antonella Clerici as Mr. Tappabuco

See also 
 List of Christmas films
 List of Italian films of 2015

References

External links 

2010s crime comedy films
Italian crime comedy films
Italian buddy comedy films
2010s buddy comedy films
Italian Christmas comedy films
2010s Italian-language films
Films directed by Volfango De Biasi
2010s Italian films
2010s Christmas comedy films